Chilodonta suduirauti is a species of sea snail, a marine gastropod mollusk in the family Chilodontaidae .

Members of the order Vestigastropoda are both simultaneous hermaphrodites and dioecious species.

Description
The height of the shell attains 8 mm. The shell is off-white in color with small bumps lining the shell that are rigid to the touch..

Distribution
This marine species occurs off the Philippines. It is found in tropical environments.

References

External links
 

suduirauti
Gastropods described in 2006